The Dayan calendar (大衍暦, Dayan Li), also known as Daien or Daiyan or Taien calendar, was a Chinese lunisolar calendar.  It was developed in China; in Japan, it was used from about 746 to 857.

History
The calendar was created in China.  It was first used in the 17th year of the Kaigen era during the Tang Dynasty.

The  Taien-reki system corrected errors in the Genka calendar and Gihō calendar which were used in Japan in the first half of the 8th century. It was the work of Yi Xing, who was a Chinese astronomer.

See also
 Japanese calendar
 Sexagenary cycle

References

Further reading
 Charlotte von Verschuer (1985).  Les relations officielles du Japon avec la Chine aux VIIIe et IXe siècles (Hachi-kyū-seiki no Nitchū kankei), pp. 243-245 n. 114.

External links
 National Diet Library, "The Japanese Calendar"

Specific calendars
History of science and technology in Japan
Time in Japan